Stem cell markers are genes and their protein products used by scientists to isolate and identify stem cells. Stem cells can also be identified by functional assays.  Below is a list of genes/protein products that can be used to identify various types of stem cells, or functional assays that do the same. The initial version of the list below was obtained by mining the PubMed database as described in

Stem cell marker names

References

Stem cells
Induced stem cells